Cannabis in North Macedonia is legal for medical purposes, but illegal for recreational purposes.

Medical cannabis
On February 9, 2016, the Macedonian Parliament Health Committee gave its approval for the legalization of medical marijuana. Beginning in June 2016, patients without a prescription were allowed to buy oil with 0.2 per cent cannabinoids or less; more concentrated forms require prescription.

Recreational use
On November 20 2020, the prime minister Zoran Zaev said the government is looking to legalize the recreational use of marijuana in the country's hospitality places and tourist hotspots, including Skopje and Ohrid.

References

Macedonia
Politics of North Macedonia
Society of North Macedonia
Drugs in North Macedonia